Golgoth 13 were a French band, formed in 2000 in Bayonne (France) by Sébastien Lasserre (guitar) and Grégory Sentenac (organ). They were soon joined by Sylvain Aubert on scratches and sampling, and they records their first album Golgoth 13 et leur "fantastic rodéo sound" in August 2000. They were later joined by Hervé Zwingelstein as a fourth member, on bass guitar. Following the recording of the band's second album Bruce Lee died in Galway in 2004, Grégory Sentenac was replaced by Stéphane Paulini (organ), and later, Stéphane Garin (organ, percussion). The group disbanded in 2007.

Releases
The band has released two albums in France:
Golgoth 13 et "leur fantastic rodeo sound" (self titled). 2001, Skunk diskak/Chaussettes Records
Golgoth 13 et "leur fantastic rodeo sound": "Bruce Lee died in Galway". 2005, Chaussettes Records

External links
Official website

French musical groups